Isua may refer to:
Isua Greenstone Belt, a Greenlandic greenstone belt
Isua Iron Mine, a proposed open-pit iron mine